The Masqueraders is a 1915 American drama silent film directed by James Kirkwood, Sr. The film stars Hazel Dawn, Elliott Dexter, Frank Losee, Norman Tharp, Ida Darling and Evelyn Farris. It is an adaptation of the 1894 play by English dramatist Henry Arthur Jones. The film was released on October 28, 1915, by Paramount Pictures.

Plot
High-born but poor Dulcie Larondie is working as a bar maid in the Skagg Inn when she accepts a marriage proposal from the wealthy Sir Brice Skene, rejecting in the process the love of David Remon, an impoverished astronomer. Sir Brice turns out to be a drunk, a gambler and a wife-beater, who loses his fortune four years into the marriage. Remon wins her back in a game of cards with Skene, who is shortly afterwards murdered by a blackmailing acquaintance. This leaves Dulcie free to marry David.

Cast 
Hazel Dawn as Dulcie Larendie
Elliott Dexter as David Remon
Frank Losee as Sir Brice Skene
Norman Tharp as Monte Lushington
Ida Darling as Lady Crandover
Evelyn Farris as Clarice
Nina Lindsey as Helen Lardendie
Charles Bryant as Eddie Remon
Russell Bassett as Inn Proprietor

References

External links 
 
 

1915 films
1910s English-language films
Silent American drama films
1915 drama films
Paramount Pictures films
Films directed by James Kirkwood Sr.
American black-and-white films
Films set in England
American silent feature films
1910s American films